Biba was a London fashion store of the 1960s and 1970s. Biba was started and primarily run by the Polish-born Barbara Hulanicki with help of her husband Stephen Fitz-Simon.

Early years
Biba's early years were rather humble, with many of the outfits being inexpensive and available to the public by mail order. The first store, in Abingdon Road in Kensington, was opened in September 1964. Biba's postal boutique had its first significant success in May 1964 when it offered a pink gingham dress with a hole cut out of the back of the neck with a matching triangular kerchief to readers of the Daily Mirror. The dress had celebrity appeal, as a similar dress had been worn by Brigitte Bardot. By the morning after the dress was advertised in the Daily Mirror, over 4,000 orders had been received. Ultimately, some 17,000 outfits were sold. Following this success, Biba moved to new, enhanced premises in Kensington Church Street.

Hulanicki worked as a fashion illustrator after studying at Brighton Art College in the late 1950s. She married advertising executive Stephen Fitz-Simon and they soon opened a mail order clothing company that she named Biba's Postal Boutique. Biba was the nickname of her younger sister Biruta.

Big Biba

In 1973 with the backing of Dorothy Perkins and British Land, the store moved to the seven-storey Derry & Toms department store, which immediately attracted up to a million customers weekly, making it one of the most visited tourist attractions in London. There were different departments, and each floor had its own theme, such as a children's floor, a floor for men, a book store, a food market, and a "home" floor which sold items such as wallpaper, paint, cutlery, soft furnishings and even statues. The overall design was produced by Whitmore-Thomas Partnership, run by artist/designers Steve Thomas and Tim Whitmore. Each department had its own logo or sign, which was based on the Biba logo and had a picture describing the department. These were commissioned by Thomas and Whitmore and designed by Kasia Charko.

The store had an Art Deco-interior reminiscent of the Golden Age of Hollywood and non-traditional displays, such as a giant Snoopy and his doghouse in the children's department, where merchandise based on the Peanuts comic strip was sold. The Biba Food Hall was also designed ingeniously, each part being aimed at one particular kind of product; a unit made to look like a dog (based on Hulanicki's own dog, a Great Dane named Othello) consisted of dog food; a huge baked beans tin can consisted of only tins of Baked beans; a can of "Warhol's Condensed Soup" etc., all foods having individual innovative units.
Also at the new "Big Biba" was "The Rainbow Restaurant", which was located on the fifth floor of the department store and was destined to become a major hang-out for rock stars, but which was not solely the reserve of the elite. With all of these renovations and additions, Biba became known as a "theatre for fashion." Also at the site was the Kensington Roof Gardens, which are still there today.

Demise
Big Biba was a huge responsibility in terms of expense and organization, but Hulanicki and Fitz felt they needed to "keep moving forward." Because of this massive undertaking, Hulanicki said, "Every time I went into the shop, I was afraid it would be for the last time." No one was aware of how serious the financial difficulties were going to be - and they proved too much for the new entrepreneurs; as a result Dorothy Perkins and Dennis Day came to save the day and bought 75% (approx.) of Biba. This led to the formation of Biba Ltd, which meant that the brand and the store could now be properly financed.

After disagreements with the Board over creative control, Hulanicki left the company and, shortly afterwards in 1975, Biba was closed by the British Land Company. The Dorothy Perkins shareholders decided that the Derry and Toms building that housed Big Biba was worth more than the ailing business itself. It sold the trademark to a consortium with no connection to Barbara Hulanicki, who opened a store in London on 27 November 1978, on two floors in Conduit Street in London's Mayfair. The store was not a success, and closed less than two years later.

Relaunches
There have been several attempts to relaunch Biba, the first occurring as soon after its closure as 1977. Another relaunch took place in the mid-1990s with Monica Zipper as head designer. Barbara Hulanicki has not been involved with any of these relaunches, and due to the use of Biba's logo and similar labels, these garments are easy to pass off as original vintage pieces.

The Biba label was relaunched again in May 2006 under designer Bella Freud. Again, Biba's founder, Barbara Hulanicki, was not contacted for the relaunch and said it was 'very, very painful', believing that the new Biba would 'betray its heritage.' Freud's first collection Spring/Summer 2007 was unveiled at London Fashion Week in September 2006, and was criticised for straying from the original concept of low-priced clothes for teenagers, needing 'more polish', as they 'had a Biba flavour but lacked the retro details that the original Biba designs had.' Freud's second attempt, Autumn/Winter 2007 was also panned as 'the kind of thing that's already over-available in fast fashion chains.' Freud left the company after just 2 seasons in June 2007 to relaunch her own label. The Biba relaunch failed and the company went into administration for a second time in 2008.

House of Fraser bought the company in November 2009 for a second relaunch by an in-house design team, announcing Daisy Lowe as the new face of the label. Hector Castro and a five-strong team were selected to replace Freud with couture hats created by Prudence Millinery. This relaunch was highly successful, outselling House of Fraser's other in-house brands in just two weeks of its launch, boosting its year end sales. Meanwhile, Hulanicki instead designed capsule collections for rival high-street company Topshop, and once again expressed her unhappiness with the relaunch, attacking the new Biba as "too expensive" and "for failing to reflect the original Biba style". She also signed with Asda to produce three to four collections of clothing retailing between £11 and £18.

In 2014, it was announced that Hulanicki would be a consultant to the Biba brand, after signing an agreement with House of Fraser.

Legacy
 A musical play called Biba: The Musical based on the story of Hulanicki and the original company was in the works in 2009.
 "Biba dresses" were listed by Leeds alternative rock band Grammatics Inkjet Lakes from their self-titled debut album.
 Biba's closing sale is mentioned in the lyrics of the Pet Shop Boys' track "Requiem in Denim and Leopardskin" (featured on the album Elysium).
 In the film Made in Dagenham (2010, set in 1968), the main character, Rita O'Grady, borrows a red Biba dress for her first meeting with Barbara Castle, only to find that the minister's outfit comes from C&A.
 "The Biba Crowd" by Edward Rogers
In the film Bohemian Rhapsody (2018), 'Mary Austin' (Lucy Boynton) the former fiancé of Freddie Mercury', (Rami Malek), works at the Biba store. Several referrals are made to Biba. When Freddie Mercury visits Mary Austin during her shift in the Biba store, he tries on a velvet suit from the woman's department. In one scene, Freddie compliments Mary on her beautiful coat. [Freddie] 'I love your coat'. [Mary] ' Thank you, it's Biba'.

See also 
 
I Was Lord Kitcheners Valet

References

Bibliography
 Hulanicki, Barbara (1983). From A to Biba. London: Hutchinson & Co.
 Thomas, Steven, & Alwyn W. Turner (2006). Welcome to Big Biba. Woodbridge: Antique Collectors Club.
 Turner, Alwyn W. (2004). The Biba Experience. Woodbridge: Antique Collectors Club.

External links

BBC Radio 4 - Woman's Hour - Biba 40th Anniversary
Exploring 20th century London - Biba Items and oral histories from Biba
BBC British Style Genius Video. Twiggy with Barbara Hulanicki discussing Biba

Clothing retailers of the United Kingdom
Clothing brands of the United Kingdom
Shops in London
Clothing companies established in 1964
Retail companies established in 1964
1960s fashion
1970s fashion
Art Nouveau
Defunct retail companies of the United Kingdom
1964 establishments in the United Kingdom
1975 disestablishments in the United Kingdom
History of the Royal Borough of Kensington and Chelsea